Arausio was a local Celtic water god who gave his name to the town of Arausio (Orange) in southern Gaul, as attested to by ancient inscriptions.

The modern name of both the city and the family that established itself there, the House of Orange-Nassau, is a corrupted version of the Celtic word Arausio. In the Middle Ages, the name of the city was conflated in French and Late Latin with another word, orange.

References

Gaulish gods
Sea and river gods
Orange, Vaucluse